Swathi is a 1994 Indian Kannada-language romantic drama film, directed by Shivamani and produced by S. Shailendra Babu. The film stars Sudharani and Shashikumar, while Vajramuni, Avinash and Umashree played key supporting roles. The film's music was scored by M. M. Keeravani, whilst the cinematography was by P. K. H. Das.

The film released on 18 January 1994 to positive response from critics and audience.

Cast

 Sudharani as Swathi
 Shashikumar
 Umashree
 Vajramuni
 B. V. Radha
 Sundar Krishna Urs
 Bank Janardhan
 Avinash
 Padma Vasanthi
 Shivaram
 Tennis Krishna
 Rekha Das
 Shobhraj

Soundtrack
The music of the film was composed by M. M. Keeravani. After release, the soundtrack was well received and all the songs became very popular. Audio was released on Akash Audio.

References

1994 films
1990s Kannada-language films
Indian romantic drama films
Films scored by M. M. Keeravani
1994 romantic drama films